The ABC Under-18 Championship 2000 is the 16th edition of the ABC's junior championship for basketball. The games were held at Kuala Lumpur, Malaysia from July 18–27, 2000.

Preliminary round

Group A

Group B

Group C

Group D

Quarterfinal round

Group I

Group II

Group III

Group IV

Classification 5th–16th

15th place

13th place

11th place

9th place

7th place

5th place

Final round

Semifinals

3rd place

Final

Final standing

Awards

Most Valuable Player:  Bang Sung-Yoon
Best Playmaker:  Haruhito Shishito

References
 Fiba Archive

FIBA Asia Under-18 Championship
2000–01 in Asian basketball
International basketball competitions hosted by Malaysia
2000 in Malaysian sport
July 2000 sports events in Asia